The WTA Aix-en-Provence Open is a defunct WTA Tour affiliated tennis tournament played in 1988. It was held in Aix-en-Provence in France and played on outdoor clay courts.

Results

Singles

Doubles

References
 WTA Results Archive

 
Clay court tennis tournaments
Defunct tennis tournaments in France
Aix